Shōgo Tomiyama (富山省吾, born 1952 in Tokyo, Japan) is a Japanese former producer and writer.

Filmography

Producer

 Yuki no dansho - jonetsu(1985)
 Young Girls in Love (1986)
 Totto Channel (1987)
 Gorufu yoakemae (1987)
 Godzilla vs. Biollante (1989)
 Chōshōjo Reiko (1991)
 Godzilla vs. King Ghidorah (1991)
 Godzilla vs. Mothra (1992)
 Godzilla vs. Mechagodzilla II (1993)
 Godzilla vs. SpaceGodzilla (1994)
 Yamato Takeru (1994)
 Godzilla vs. Destoroyah (1995)
 Rebirth of Mothra (1996)
 Rebirth of Mothra II (1997)
 Rebirth of Mothra III (1998)
 Godzilla 2000 (1999)
 Godzilla vs. Megaguirus (2000)
 Godzilla, Mothra and King Ghidorah: Giant Monsters All-Out Attack (2001)
 Godzilla Against Mechagodzilla (2002)
 Godzilla: Tokyo S.O.S. (2003)
 Godzilla: Final Wars (2004)
 Love Never to End (2007)

Writer
 Godzilla: Final Wars (2004)

References

 http://www.tohokingdom.com/people/shogo_tomiyama.htm.
 https://www.imdb.com/name/nm0866755/

Japanese film producers
Living people
1952 births
People from Tokyo